Blade is a consumer magazine about knife collecting. The magazine is based in Appleton, Wisconsin.

History and profile
First published in 1973 under the title American Blade by Southern House Publishing Co. with Blackie Collins as the editor. The headquarters was in Chattanooga, Tennessee. The magazine's title was changed to Blade in 1982 after its purchase by Jim Parker and Bruce Voyles. In the 1980s, the magazine served as the launching point for an annual convention for knife collectors, the Blade Show; established a Cutlery Hall of Fame; and spun off a trade magazine, Blade Trade. In 1994, Voyles, then the sole owner, sold the publication and its properties to Krause Publications, which increased its frequency to monthly. F+W Publications Inc. purchased Krause Publications and Blade in 2002 and published it under its brand beginning in October 2004. In 2018, Gun Digest Media LLC acquired Blade, Blade Show and all related properties.

Coverage in the magazine ranges across the knife hobby, including military knives, kitchen cutlery, and manufacturing and legislation issues. The magazine publishes several identification columns and values for collectible knives.

Blade sponsors two annual knife shows every year. The Blade Show, held in Atlanta, Georgia every Spring and the Usual Suspect Gathering held in Las Vegas, Nevada in September.

Cutlery Hall of Fame
Every year, Blade enters a new person into the "Cutlery Hall of Fame".  The Cutlery Hall of Fame is composed of knifemakers, authors and persons who promote knife making, Bladesmithing, and Knife collecting.  Each year, the living members of the Cutlery Hall Of Fame nominate and vote on the latest inductee to join their ranks.
Henry D. Baer - Knifemaker, President of Schrade Knives and namesake of the "Uncle Henry" brand of pocketknives.
Dewey Ferguson - Author
Bo Randall - Knifemaker 
James B. Lile - Knifemaker 
 M.H. Cole - Knifemaker and Author 
 Al Buck - Founder of Buck Knives 
 William R. Williamson - Scholar and collector of Bowie knives
 Pete Gerber - Founder of Gerber Legendary Blades
 Bob Loveless - Knifemaker
 William F. Moran -  Bladesmith
 Jim Parker - Knifemaker
 George Herron - Knifemaker  1932-2007
 Frank Buster - Knifemaker
 Frank Forsyth
 A.G. Russell - Knifemaker
 Ken Warner - Author    
 Jim Bowie - Father of the Bowie knife
 Maury Shavin
 Hubert Lawell
 William Scagel - Knifemaker  
 Gil Hibben - Knifemaker
 Harry McEvoy - Author
 Buster Warenski - Knifemaker      
 Albert M. Baer - Founder of Schrade Knives
 Col. Rex Applegate - Knife designer, author    
 B.R. Hughes - Author
 Bruce Voyles - Author    
 Bernard Levine - Author    
 Houston Price - Author
 Bill Adams - Author    
 Jim Weyer - Author and photographer
 Chuck Buck - Knifemaker - Buck Knives
 Blackie Collins - Knifemaker 
 Frank Centofante - Knifemaker
 Ron Lake - Knifemaker
 Sal Glesser - Designer, Founder of Spyderco
 Joe Drouin - Knife Collector       
 Bob Schrimsher - Knifemaking Supply
 Rudy Ruana - Knifemaker  
 D¹Alton Holder - Knifemaker
 Michael Walker - Knifemaker, Inventor of the Walker linerlock
 George "Butch" Winter - Author
 Tim Leatherman - Inventor of the multi-tool knife and founder of Leatherman Tools
 Dan Dennehy - Knifemaker, Founding Member of the Knifemakers' Guild
 Ken Onion - Knifemaker and inventor of the SpeedSafe Mechanism
 Al Mar - Knifemaker, founder of Al Mar Knives
 Paul Bos - Master heat treater - Buck Knives
 Kit Carson - Knifemaker
 Wayne Goddard - Knifemaker
 Chris Reeve - Knifemaker

References

External links
 Official site

Consumer magazines
Hobby magazines published in the United States
Magazines established in 1973
Magazines published in Wisconsin
Monthly magazines published in the United States
Magazines published in Tennessee